An Introduction to Old Norse is a textbook written by E. V. Gordon, arising from his teaching at the University of Leeds and first published in 1927 in Oxford at The Clarendon Press. The Second Edition was revised (1957) by A. R. Taylor, Gordon's former student and, indirectly, his Leeds successor. It was most recently reprinted in 1990 by the Oxford University Press. According to Todd Krause of the Linguistics Research Centre at the University of Texas, the work is "still considered the standard reference, though often extremely daunting for self-study."

Overview
An Introduction to Old Norse is commonly accepted as a standard text in the English-speaking world for studying Old Norse. It includes a long introduction, a short grammar of Old Norse, a glossary, an index of names and selections from the Poetic Edda as well as a number of other sagas (all in Old Norse).

The introduction of the text traces the literary history of Old Norse and describes the literary merits, historical accuracy, and compositional style of Old Norse texts. In it, Gordon draws comparisons to other languages and texts of the Middle Ages such as the Old English epic poem Beowulf.

The central part of the book is composed of selections of Old Norse texts, including the entire text of Hrafnkels saga in the Second Edition. Other selections include the poem "Þrymskviða" and parts of Hrólfs saga kraka.  Both East Norse and West Norse are represented, and there are also runic inscriptions.

The grammar portion of the text is written with the understanding that the reader would be familiar with linguistics, particularly those of Germanic languages.  Verb conjugations are given in accordance with stem class, and Gordon often gives the historical reasons for particular changes in word form.  There are also notes on the text selections, particularly glosses of difficult lines, as well as notes on differences between branches of Old Norse, both phonologically and in writing.

It includes a comprehensive glossary that often includes cross-references to specific paradigm numbers, including a portion of names that occur within the selected readings.  Various illustrations occur throughout, typically of Norsemen and Scandinavian-related halls, weapons, etc.

The Readings
Although the original work in An Introduction to Old Norse is still under copyright in the US due to the Uruguay Round Agreements Act, the readings of Old Norse passages are not under copyright. A copy of all of the readings in Old Norse from the book is available online.

References

Reviews

Second edition

Historical linguistics books
Old Norse
Language textbooks